Debonair is a 1930 British play by Frank Vosper, based on a novel of the same title by Gladys Bronwyn Stern who co-wrote the adaptation with Vosper.

It ran for 37 performances at the Lyric Theatre in London's West End. The original cast included Vosper, Celia Johnson, Mary Jerrold, Walter Fitzgerald, Kate Cutler and May Hallatt. It was cut dramatically after its opening performance.

References

Bibliography
 Wearing, J.P. The London Stage 1930-1939: A Calendar of Productions, Performers, and Personnel.  Rowman & Littlefield, 2014.

1930 plays
West End plays
Comedy plays
Plays by Frank Vosper